The Best of Two Worlds was released by Columbia Records in 1976 to feature Stan Getz in a reunion with João Gilberto. Their previous collaboration was a decade earlier on Getz/Gilberto Vol. 2. Heloisa Buarque de Hollanda (Miúcha), who was then married to João Gilberto, sang the English vocals.

Reception

The Allmusic review by Thom Jurek stated "In all, this is as fine a bossa album as Getz ever recorded, standing among his finest works, and without a doubt equals his earlier collaborations with Jobim and Gilberto".

Track listing

Personnel 
Stan Getz - tenor saxophone
Albert Dailey - piano
Clint Houston or Steve Swallow - bass
Billy Hart or Grady Tate - drums
Airto Moreira, Reuben Bassini, Ray Armando, João Gilberto, Sonny Carr - percussion
Heloisa (Miúcha) Buarque de Hollanda - English vocals
João Gilberto - Portuguese vocals, guitar
Oscar Castro-Neves - guitar, musical arrangements

Production 
Produced by Stan Getz
Executive producer Teo Macero
Recording engineer Stan Tonkel

References

Sources 
Gridley, Mark. Jazz Styles: History and Analysis. 9th. NJ: Pearson Prentice Hall, Print.

1976 albums
Bossa nova albums
Stan Getz albums
João Gilberto albums